The Sri Lankan state has been accused of state terrorism against the Tamil minority as well as the Sinhalese majority, during the two Marxist–Leninist insurrections. The Sri Lankan government and the Sri Lankan Armed Forces have been charged with massacres, indiscriminate shelling and bombing, extrajudicial killings, rape, torture, disappearance, arbitrary detention, forced displacement and economic blockade. According to Amnesty International state terror was institutionalized into Sri Lanka's laws, government and society.

History

20th century

Sri Lanka gained independence from Britain in 1948 as the Dominion of Ceylon, although the British Royal Navy retained a base there until 1956. In 1972, the country became a republic, adopting the name Sri Lanka. Since this time, the country has experienced several major conflicts – a civil war, Marxist uprisings, also several other conflicts.

Marxist-Leninist insurrections

From 1985 to 1989, Sri Lanka responded to violent insurrection with equal violence against the Sinhalese majority as part of the counterinsurgency measures against the uprising by the Marxist Janatha Vimukthi Peramuna (JVP) party. In order to subdue those supporting the JVP uprising, a wide range of acts of cruelty were recorded as having been carried out by the state, including the torture and mass murder of school children. This repression peaked among the Sinhala population during 1989–90. Approximately 90,000 casualties occurred during the 1971-1990 period, most of whom were Sinhalese male youths

Civil war
The Sri Lankan Civil War lasted from 1983 to 2009. In 1986 an American-Tamil social anthropologist at Harvard University stated that acts of "terrorism" had been committed by all sides during the war, but although all parties in the conflict had resorted to the use of these tactics, in terms of scale, duration, and sheer numbers of victims, the Sri Lankan state was particularly culpable. This was echoed by the Secretary of the Movement for Development and Democratic Rights, a Non-governmental organisation (NGO), which further claimed that the Sri Lankan state viewed killing as an essential political tool.  This had originally prompted the demand for a separate state for minority Tamils called Tamil Eelam in the north of the country, an idea first articulated by S.J.V. Chelvanayagam in 1976.

Assaults on Tamils for ethnic reasons have been alleged, and the experience of state terrorism by the people of Jaffna has been alleged to have been instrumental in persuading the United National Party to increase their hostilities there.

Chandrika Kumaratunga was the President of Sri Lanka from 1994 to 2005. In an interview with the British television presenter and news critic David Frost, she has stated that at the time that her husband Vijaya Kumaranatunga was assassinated, "Sri Lanka had a killing fields, there was a lot of terror perpetrated by the government itself, state terrorism." This statement has been supported by a report released by the Asian Legal Resource Centre (ALRC), a Non-governmental organization based in Hong Kong and associated with the United Nations, which has also claimed that there was widespread terrorism by the state during this period.

21st century
Following the collapse of peace talks in 2006, human rights agencies such as the Asian Center of Human Rights (ACHR),  the University Teachers for Human Rights (UTHR), and  pro-LTTE political parties such as the Tamil National Alliance, claimed that the government of Sri Lanka had unleashed state terrorism as part of its counterinsurgency measures against the rebel LTTE movement. The Sri Lankan government responded by claiming that these allegations by the LTTE were an attempt by the LTTE to justify their own acts of terrorism.

The ACHR has also stated that following the collapse of the Geneva talks of February 2006, the government of Sri Lanka perpetrated a campaign of state terrorism by targeting alleged LTTE sympathizers and Tamil civilians. A spokesman for Human Rights Watch was of the opinion that: "The Sri Lankan government has apparently given its security forces a green light to use dirty war tactics." International intervention in Sri Lanka was requested by Tamil sources to protect civilians from state terror.

The Prevention of Terrorism Act (PTA) was implemented to fight against the freedom fighting organisation LTTE but even after declaring a victory over this organisation, The Sri Lankan government continues to implement it on civilians and journalists. Human rights organisations and activists have a hard time agreeing with this law and consider it a human rights violation since it justifies arbitrary arrests without trials. The law has been regulated to send all people who cause "religious, racial or communal disharmony" to be sent to rehabilitation centres. They were kept censored and refrained from expressing themselves in any way or form. While PTA is a violation itself, the more disturbing fact is that it is usually implemented on minorities and reinforces their identities to be erased. Muslims living on the island are sent off to militarized rehabilitation centres to unlearn their radical views and Tamils are sent to distance themselves from any form of resistance against the state. However, all this law does is stereotyping minority groups of being radical and extremist by only targeting them and erasing their identity as Muslims or Tamils by vilifying everything that is related to these two identities. Muslims cannot act out their religious freedoms without being radicalized and Tamil are infringed of their self-determination or else they are considered as rebels or terrorists. PTA laws have another dreadful consequence: The disappearance of thousands. PTA allows arbitrary arrests which are permanently made lawful. White vans abductions  have also made their arrivals into playing a significant role as a human rights violation under PTA. Suspects are kidnapped by unidentified members and brought back dead or detained LTTE members disappeared forever, leaving their families with many unanswered questions. These unanswered questions lead to many legal issues and collisions: A disappeared person's death or life cannot be determined which means the families won't get a death certificate. Without a death certificate the families face problems in inheritance and other legal affairs.

State terrorist groups
Sri Lankan government have been accused of the usage state-sponsored paramilitaries to commit war crimes. Most of them were created at the height of the second JVP uprising. During the civil war, the main state sponsored paramilitary was the Tamil Makkal Viduthalai Pulikal, which was led by Karuna Amman.

Anti-separatist paramilitaries
Eelam People's Democratic Party - Led by former leader of the Eelam People's Revolutionary Liberation Front, Douglas Devananda
Tamil People's Liberation Tigers - Perhaps the most controversial group, the leader was the former LTTE commander of the Eastern Province

Anti-communist paramilitaries
Eagles of the Central Hills - Formerly active in Kandy. Responsible for the massacre of suspected rebels in 1989. Also responsible for the killings of workers at the Peradeniya University.
Black Cat group - Responsible for attacks on politicians and civilians. Threatened the members of the CPSL in the late 1980s.

See also
State sponsored terrorism
Iran and state terrorism
Terrorism in Russia
United States and state-sponsored terrorism

Notes

References

Further reading

External links 
 Lanka's Killing Fields: War Crimes Unpunished

Political repression
Sri Lankan Tamil history
 
Sri Lankan Civil War